Dominik Lanius (born 28 March 1997) is a German professional footballer who plays as a defender for Fortuna Köln.

Club career
On 23 May 2019, FC Viktoria Köln confirmed, that they had re-signed Lanius on a one-year contract for the 2019–20 season.

References

External links
 
 

1997 births
Living people
Footballers from Cologne
German footballers
Association football defenders
FC Viktoria Köln players
SC Preußen Münster players
SC Fortuna Köln players
3. Liga players
Regionalliga players